The Durham (County Palatine) Act 1836 (6 & 7 Will 4 c 19) was an Act of the Parliament of the United Kingdom. It abolished the temporal authority of the Bishop of Durham within the County Palatine of Durham, placing the county under lay administration. Previously, since 1075, the so-called prince-bishops had substantial powers as earls "with the right to raise an army, mint his own coins, and levy taxes".

It also disbanded the Court of the County of Durham, appointing the High Sheriff as judge of a regular county court. Doubts about the construction of this Act led to the enactment of the Durham County Palatine Act 1858.

Repeal
In a report dated 28 October 1975, the Law Commission and the Scottish Law Commission said that the unrepealed residue of this Act was spent because of the abolition of the Court of Chancery of the County Palatine of Durham and Sadberge. They recommended that the whole Act be repealed. The Act was repealed by Part I of Schedule 1 to the Statute Law (Repeals) Act 1976.

Section 1 - The Palatine Jurisdiction of the Bishop of Durham to be separated from the Bishopric and vested in the Crown
The words from "and all forfeitures" to "in right of the same" in this section were repealed by section 9(2) of, and Part I of the Third Schedule to, the Crown Estate Act 1961.

The proviso to this section was repealed by section 56 of, and Schedule 11 to, the Courts Act 1971. The repeal was consequential on the abolition of the Court of Chancery of the County Palatine of Durham and Sadberge by section 41 of that Act.

Section 2 - County court to cease
This section abolished the Court of the County of Durham and the office of the clerk of that court.

Section 7 - Extent of the words "County of Durham"
This section enacted:

This definition is referred to in section 1 of the Durham County Palatine Act 1858.

Section 9 - Reservation of rights to the Bishopric
This section was repealed by section 9(2) of, and Part I of the Third Schedule to, the Crown Estate Act 1961.

References
Halsbury's Statutes,
The Statutes of the United Kingdom of Great Britain and Ireland, 6 & 7 Will IV. 1836. King's Printer. 1836. Pages 130 to 132.
Hansard

External links
  The Durham (County Palatine) Act 1836, from Google Books.

United Kingdom Acts of Parliament 1836
Acts of the Parliament of the United Kingdom concerning England
History of County Durham